Lofanga is an island in Tonga. It is located within the Ha'apai Group in the centre of the country, to northeast of the national capital of Nukualofa. The island had a population of 137 at 2016, and an area of 1.45 km2.

See also 
 List of cities in Tonga

References 

Islands of Tonga
Haʻapai